Insulin-like growth factor-binding protein 1 (IBP-1) also known as placental protein 12 (PP12) is a protein that in humans is encoded by the IGFBP1 gene.

Function 

This gene is a member of the Insulin-like growth factor-binding protein (IGFBP) family and encodes a protein with an IGFBP domain and a type-I thyroglobulin domain. The protein binds both insulin-like growth factors (IGFs) I and II and circulates in the plasma. Binding of this protein prolongs the half-life of the IGFs and alters their interaction with cell surface receptors. Alternate transcriptional splice variants, encoding different isoforms, have been characterized.

References

Further reading